Deathstalker Destiny is a science fiction novel by British author Simon R Green. 
The sixth in a series of nine novels, Deathstalker Destiny is part homage to - and part parody of - the classic space operas of the 1950s, and deals with the themes of honour, love, courage and betrayal.
 
Set in a far-future fictional universe, Deathstalker Destiny develops the plot and themes introduced in the previous books in the series.

References

1998 British novels
British science fiction novels
Orion Books books